Kızılcaağaç can refer to:

 Kızılcaağaç, Beyağaç
 Kızılcaağaç, Bucak